The hydrogen fluoride laser is an infrared chemical laser. It is capable of delivering continuous output power in the megawatt range.

Hydrogen fluoride lasers operate at the wavelength of 2.7-2.9 µm. This wavelength is absorbed by the atmosphere, effectively attenuating the beam and reducing its reach, unless used in a vacuum environment. However, when deuterium is used instead of hydrogen, the deuterium fluoride lases at the wavelength of about 3.8 µm. This makes the deuterium fluoride laser usable for terrestrial operations.

Deuterium fluoride laser 
The deuterium fluoride laser constructionally resembles a rocket engine. In the combustion chamber, ethylene is burned in nitrogen trifluoride. This reaction produces free excited fluorine radicals. Just after the nozzle, the mixture of helium and hydrogen or deuterium gas is injected to the exhaust stream; the hydrogen or deuterium reacts with the fluorine radicals, producing excited molecules of deuterium fluoride or hydrogen fluoride. The excited molecules then undergo stimulated emission in the optical resonator region of the laser.

Deuterium fluoride lasers have found military applications: the MIRACL laser, the Pulsed Energy Projectile, and the Tactical High Energy Laser are of the deuterium fluoride type.

Fusion 
An Argentine-American physicist and accused spy, Leonardo Mascheroni, has proposed the idea of using hydrogen fluoride lasers to produce nuclear fusion.

References

Chemical lasers